The 4th Battalion, Canadian Mounted Rifles was authorized on 7 November 1914 as the 4th Regiment, Canadian Mounted Rifles, CEF and embarked for Britain on 18 July 1915. It disembarked in France on 24 October 1915, where it fought as part of the 2nd Brigade Canadian Mounted Rifles until 31 December 1915, when it was converted to infantry and allocated to the 8th Canadian Infantry Brigade, 3rd Canadian Division. The regiment was redesignated the 4th Battalion, Canadian Mounted Rifles, CEF on 1 January 1916 and was disbanded on 6 November 1920.

History 
The battalion recruited in Militia District 2 in Ontario and was mobilized at Toronto, Ontario. Most of their recruits came from the militia cavalry regiments from Militia District 2: The Governor General's Body Guard, the 2nd Dragoons, the 9th Mississauga Horse and the 25th Brant Dragoons.

The battalion had four Officers Commanding:

Lt.-Col. S.F. Smith, 18 July 1915 – 6 March 1916
Lt.-Col. J.F.H. Ussher, 6 March 1916 – 3 June 1916
Lt.-Col. H.D.L. Gordon, DSO, 7 June 1916 – 27 May 1917
Lt.-Col. W.R. Patterson, DSO, 28 May 1917-Demobilization

Victoria Cross 
One member of the battalion, Pte Thomas William Holmes, won the Victoria Cross for his actions on 26 October 1917 during the Battle of Passchendaele. Pte Holmes, then 19, is Canada's youngest Victoria Cross winner.

Perpetuations 
The 4th Battalion, Canadian mounted rifles is perpetuated by The Governor General's Horse Guards.

Battle honours 
The battalion was awarded the following battle honours:

MOUNT SORREL
SOMME, 1916
FLERS-COURCELETTE
Ancre heights
ARRAS, 1917, '18
VIMY, 1917
Hill 70
YPRES, 1917
PASSCHENDAELE
AMIENS
Scarpe, 1918
Hindenburg Line
Canal du Nord
CAMBRAI, 1918
Valenciennes
Sambre
FRANCE and FLANDERS, 1915-18

See also 

 List of mounted regiments in the Canadian Expeditionary Force
 List of infantry battalions in the Canadian Expeditionary Force

References

Works cited
Canadian Expeditionary Force 1914-1919 by Col. G. W. L. Nicholson, CD, Queen's Printer, Ottawa, Ontario, 1962

Further reading

004
Military units and formations of Ontario
Governor General's Horse Guards